Air Vice-Marshal Harry Gill CB OBE (30 October 1922 – 20 January 2008) also known Jimmy, was a British World War II fighter pilot who later rose as air vice-marshal and became the Director-General of Engineering and Supply Policy at the Ministry of Defence in 1976. He also received the King's Silver Medal at Bisley in 1951.

Biography

Early life

Gill was born on 30 October 1922 in Chesterfield, England. He moved to Newark-on-Trent as a child and was educated at Newark Technical College. He trained as a pilot in the United States, he flew Hurricanes (with 279 Sqn) during the war and Mosquito FB.VIs (with 4 Sqn) in the immediate post-war period. His Mosquito, TA 122, is being restored and will be displayed at the de Havilland Museum at London Colney. He died on 20 January 2008.

Career

He was appointed OBE for his service in Aden during its evacuation in 1967. After his retirement, he remained closely associated with the Royal Air Force, serving for many years as president of the Newark Branch of the Royal Air Forces Association and he was also closely linked to the Air Training Corps (ATC), of which he was a member in his youth (with 47F Sqn at Grantham, when still an Air Defence Cadet Corps Squadron - forerunner of the ATC). In 1979, he retired from the RAF.

References

External links

 Duke of Cambridge to complete tour planned by Princess Diana

1922 births
2008 deaths
Royal Air Force personnel of World War II
People from Chesterfield, Derbyshire
People from Newark-on-Trent
Companions of the Order of the Bath
Officers of the Order of the British Empire